This page shows the results of the Judo Competition for men and women at the 1999 Pan American Games, held from July 23 to August 8, 1999 in Winnipeg, Manitoba, Canada. There were seven weight divisions.

Medal table

Men's competition

Men's Extra-Lightweight (-60 kg)

Men's Half-Lightweight (-66 kg)

Men's Lightweight (-73 kg)

Men's Half-Middleweight (-81 kg)

Men's Middleweight (-90 kg)

Men's Half-Heavyweight (-100 kg)

Men's Heavyweight (+100 kg)

Women's competition

Women's Extra-Lightweight (-48 kg)

Women's Half-Lightweight (-52 kg)

Women's Lightweight (-57 kg)

Women's Half-Middleweight (-63 kg)

Women's Middleweight (-70 kg)

Women's Half-Heavyweight (-78 kg)

Women's Heavyweight (+78 kg)

References

External links
 
 Sports 123

American Games
1999
Events at the 1999 Pan American Games
Judo competitions in Canada
International sports competitions hosted by Canada